Megablast (メガブラスト) is a horizontally scrolling shooter released internationally in arcades in 1989 by Taito. One or two players control space fighters assigned to deal with an alien invasion using incredible firepower through eight stages. Many of the minibosses resemble previous Taito game characters.

The game was re-released for the PlayStation 2 as part of Taito Memories II Gekan in 2007.

Plot
In the future, Earth has achieved a state of global peace, but one problem has arisen: a wholesale disappearance of young women. A top-secret planetary protection organization investigates the strange disappearances and discovers that the women are being abducted by aliens. The aliens hail from the planet Zancs, where a rampant disease has sterilized the entire female population. Unable to mate with their own kind, the people of Zancs have found the perfect reproductive substitutes in the women of Earth, abducting them to keep the planetary population steady.

Two fighter pilots - Downson and Bogey - are ordered to rescue the women of Earth, including one of the pilot's significant others, by flying to Zancs and eliminating any threats the inhabitants pose.

Gameplay

The ship was all ready equipped with four Options, each one set to fire in vertical and horizontal positions. The player collected orbs to empower the Option's firing strength and durability; Each Option had to be empowered by collecting the orbs depending on the Option's direction. The player's Extend was set at every 100,000 points.

The music during the demo of the game includes Fantaisie-Impromptu by Frédéric Chopin, and the ending theme contains the fourth movement of Beethoven's Symphony No. 9.

Reception
In Japan, Game Machine listed Megablast on their December 15, 1989 issue as being the twenty-first most-successful table arcade unit of the month.

References

External links
Megablast at Arcade History

1989 video games
Arcade video games
Horizontally scrolling shooters
Taito arcade games
Sterilization in fiction
Video games developed in Japan